The Center for Pacific Islands Studies, in the University of Hawaii at Mānoa School of Pacific and Asian Studies, is both an academic department and a research center on the Pacific Islands and issues of concern to Pacific Islanders. Its instructional program is regional, comparative, and interdisciplinary in nature.

The university's Pacific Collection is a comprehensive collections of Pacific materials.  The center provides international conferences, Web-based resources, its Pacific Islands Monograph Series, and its journal, The Contemporary Pacific.

References

External links

international conferences
Web-based resources
Pacific Islands Monograph Series

University of Hawaiʻi